Burnap v. United States, 252 U.S. 512 (1920), was a decision of the United States Supreme Court concerning the Appointments Clause.

References

External links 
 

1920 in United States case law
United States Supreme Court cases
United States Supreme Court cases of the White Court
Appointments Clause case law
United States separation of powers case law